The Battle of the Komandorski Islands was a naval battle between American and Imperial Japanese forces which took place on 27 March 1943 in the North Pacific, south of the Soviet Komandorski Islands.  The battle was a daylight surface engagement in which air support played no role and in which the inferior American force escaped greater damage after the Japanese chose to withdraw.

Background
When the United States became aware of Japanese plans to send a supply convoy to their forces on the Aleutian Islands of Alaska, U.S. Navy ships commanded by Rear Admiral Charles McMorris were sent to prevent this.

American intelligence estimated that the Japanese escort consisted of one heavy cruiser, one light cruiser, and four destroyers.  However, the Japanese 5th Fleet had been reinforced by two more cruisers, so that the Japanese escort force actually consisted of the heavy cruisers Nachi and Maya, the light cruisers Tama and Abukuma, and the destroyers Wakaba, Hatsushimo, Ikazuchi, and Inazuma, commanded by Vice Admiral Boshirō Hosogaya. On the early morning of 26 March, the Japanese convoy was intercepted by the American picket line some 100 miles south of the Komandorski islands and 180 miles west of Attu, just to the west of the International Date Line. Because of the remote location of the battle and chance encounter on open ocean, neither fleet had air or submarine assistance, making this one of the few engagements exclusively between surface ships in the Pacific Theater and one of the last pure gunnery duels between fleets of major surface combatants in naval history.

Although the Japanese cruisers heavily outgunned the American force, the engagement was tactically inconclusive. Both fleets suffered damage, with the U.S. Navy warships escaping greater damage after a Japanese misjudgment. With the Japanese fleet on the edge of victory, Admiral Hosogaya – not realizing the heavy damage his ships had inflicted and fearing American war planes would appear – retired without pressing his advantage. This amounted to a strategic victory for the US Navy, as it ended Japanese attempts to resupply the Aleutian garrisons by surface ship, leaving only submarines to conduct supply runs. Hosogaya was accordingly retired from active service after the battle and assigned to govern a group of South Pacific islands.

Battle
0600: The United States ships were formed in a scouting line at six-mile intervals zig-zagging at 15 knots on base course 020°.
A navigating officer on one of the transports visually observed the American force minutes later.
0740: The Americans changed course to 080° and the rear ships increased speed to operate as a compact group. Five radar contacts were counted.
0755: The Japanese turned northward to course 340° and the Americans came to course 000° to follow.
0811: The Americans visually identified the radar contacts as two transports, two light cruisers, and a destroyer.
0820: The Americans sighted the masts of four more Japanese ships on the horizon.
0835: The Americans identified the masts as two heavy cruisers and two destroyers and turned to course 240°.
0838: The Japanese transports swerved off to the northwest.
The second and third salvos were straddles.
0841: Richmond opened fire on Nachi. The third salvo was a straddle.
The second salvo was a straddle.

0845: Nachi launched eight torpedoes. All missed.
0850: One of Richmond′s  shells hit the starboard side of Nachi′s signal bridge, killing 11 and wounding 21. Another shell hit Nachi′s mainmast and severed the flagship radio communication.
0852: One of Richmond′s 6-inch shells hit Nachi′s torpedo compartment. Another of Richmond′s 6-inch shells hit Nachi′s control room, killing two and wounding five. Nachi dropped back after losing electrical power to ammunition hoists and gun mounts.
0903: Richmond ceased firing. Salt Lake City continued firing from stern turrets.
0910: Salt Lake City was hit by an  projectile fired by Maya. The starboard observation plane caught fire and was jettisoned.
0920: Salt Lake City was hit by an 8-inch projectile fired by Maya. Two men were killed.
1010: Salt Lake City was hit by an 8-inch projectile fired by Maya.
1059: Salt Lake City was hit by an 8-inch projectile fired by Maya.
1103: Salt Lake City was hit by an 8-inch projectile fired by Maya. Salt Lake City transferred water to correct a list caused by flooding.
1152: Salt Lake City was hit by an 8-inch projectile fired by Maya.
1153: Salt water entered a fuel tank in use and extinguished Salt Lake City′s boiler fires.
1154: Salt Lake City slowed to a stop. Bailey, Coghlan and Monaghan approached the Japanese cruisers for a torpedo attack while Richmond and Dale made smoke to shield Salt Lake City.
1203: Salt Lake City restarted boilers and increased speed to 15 knots.
All missed. Bailey was hit twice by 8-inch shells and came to a stop with five dead. Coghlan was hit once.
1230: Japanese ships retired westward. Neither Coghlan nor Monaghan launched torpedoes.

Salt Lake City fired 806 armor-piercing projectiles and then 26 high-capacity (explosive) shells after the supply of armor-piercing ammunition was exhausted. Powder and shells were manhandled aft from the forward magazines to keep the after guns firing. Salt Lake City′s rudder stops were carried away, limiting her to 10° course changes.

Order of battle

United States Navy
Task Group 16.6 - RADM Charles McMorris, Commander, Task Group 16.6 (a subordinate Task Group of Task Force 16)
 1  heavy cruiser:  - CAPT Bertram J. Rodgers 
 1  light cruiser:  - CAPT Theodore Waldschmidt (F)

Destroyer Squadron 14 - CAPT Ralph Riggs
 4 destroyers
 2 
 - CMDR Benjamin Tompkins
 - LCDR John Atkeson (F)
 2 
 - CMDR Anthony Rorschach
 - LCDR Peter Horn

Imperial Japanese Navy
Northern Force - VADM Boshiro Hosogaya, Commander, Fifth Fleet (Northern Force)
Cruiser Division One:
 2 heavy cruisers
 1 :  - CAPT Akira Sone (F)(Myoko class)
 1 :  - CAPT Takeji Matsumoto
 1  light cruiser:  - CAPT Zensuke Kanome

Destroyer Division 21: - CAPT Amano Shigetaka
 2  destroyers
  - LCDR Suetsugu Nobuyoshi (F)
  - LCDR Nittono Suzuo

D Convoy - RADM Tomoichi Mori, Commander, Destroyer Squadron One

 1  light cruiser:  -  CAPT Shiro Shibuya (F)

Destroyer Division Six: - CAPT Takahashi Kameshiro
 2  destroyers
  - LCDR Maeda Saneho
  - LCDR Terauchi Masamichi
Transport Asaka Maru - CAPT Sakuma Takeo
Transport Sakito Maru

2nd Escort Force
 1  destroyer:  (not engaged in the battle) - LCDR Ikeda Shunsaku
Transport Sanko Maru

Notes

References

External links
Battle of Komandorski Island: March 26, 1943
USN Combat Narrative: The Aleutians Campaign Chapter 9:The Battle of the Komandorskis

Aleutian Islands campaign
March 1943 events
Komandorski Islands